Acharya Jagadish Chandra Bose Polytechnic,  is a government polytechnic college located in Berachampa, North 24 Parganas district, West Bengal. This polytechnic is affiliated to the West Bengal State Council of Technical Education,  and recognised by AICTE, New Delhi. This polytechnic offers diploma courses in Civil, Electrical, Mechanical 
Engineering and Electronics & Telecommunication Engineering.

References

Universities and colleges in North 24 Parganas district
Technical universities and colleges in West Bengal
1962 establishments in West Bengal
Educational institutions established in 1962